Marland can refer to:

People
 Douglas Marland (1934–1993), American soap opera script writer
 E. W. Marland, Oklahoma governor
 Jonathan Marland, Baron Marland, British businessman and Conservative politician
 Lydie Marland, American socialite
 Margaret Marland, Canadian politician
 Paul Marland, British politician
 Robert Marland, Canadian Olympic rower
 William C. Marland, West Virginia governor

Places
 Marland, Oklahoma, a town
 Marland, Greater Manchester, part of the town of Rochdale
 Marland Works railway station, disused station in Devon, England

Other
 Marland Oil Company
 Marland report, a Federal report on gifted and talented education in the U.S.A.